, officially the , is a   and capital of the province of , .

Situated in the western coast of Marinduque Island, the municipality is bordered in the north by the municipality of Mogpog, in the west by the Tayabas Bay and Sibuyan Sea, in the east by the municipality of Torrijos, and in the south by the municipalities of Gasan and Buenavista.

Boac, a heritage town in its own right, is known as one of the main venues of the annual Moriones Festival and is the location of a number of historical sites in Marinduque including the Boac Cathedral fortress church, Casa Real and the Liwasan ng Kalayaan, Laylay Port, and the Battle of Paye site. The municipality is also home to the Marinduque Branch of the National Museum of the Philippines.

Etymology

The toponym Boac is derived from the Cebuano word bu-ak, cognatic to the Tagalog word bi-ak and the southern Tagalog term ba-ak. This is in reference to the town being bisected by the Boac River which runs from the Central Marinduque and Balagbag Mountain Ranges to the west coast facing the Tayabas Bay and Sibuyan Sea. Other references suggest that the name Boac is derived from the Tagalog term bulwak referring to the gush of water at the estuaries and mouth of the Boac River.

Other names
During the Spanish colonization, the first visita called Montserrat de Marinduque was established in the island in 1580 in what is now Boac.

History

In the early years of Spanish colonization in Marinduque, it was first mentioned in Miguel de Loarca's Relacion de las Yslas Filipinas (1582-1583) that the natives of the island are Pintados or tattooed people resembling those from the Camarines Provinces and the Visayan Islands.

In 1580, the first visita was established in the island of Marinduque and was called Montserrat de Marinduque in what is now the municipality of Boac; this visita was governed by Fray Alonzo Banol as minister.

In 1621, Spanish Jesuit missionaries brought a three-foot Marian image to Boac which will later be known as the Mahal na Ina ng Biglang Awa. Notorious for their sea raids, a group of Muslim pirates from the southern Philippines sieged Boac in the mid-17th century along the shores of Laylay and eventually into the Poblacion located along the Boac River.

In panic, the locals took refuge in the fortress church of Boac as able-bodied men defended the outer walls against the attacks. Many locals were killed and, by the third day of siege, the surviving locals began to run short on food and the capture of the fortress became imminent. As an act of faith, the survivors prayed fervently at the throne of Mary, asking her to deliver them from these enemies. According to legends, a very strong storm with torrential rain, thunder, and lightning engulfed the area and at its very height, it was reported that the image of a beautiful lady with outstretched arms appeared standing on the top of the fortress wall. Terrorized, the pirates fled in confusion to their vintas and left the island.

Since then, the image of Mary has been honoured and given the title "Biglang Awa." To commemorate this miracle,  the old image brought by the Jesuits in Boac was placed in a shrine erected on the portion of the wall where Mary is said to have appeared.

In 1942, Boac was occupied by Japanese troops. In 1945, the Battle of Marinduque began and the American-Philippine Commonwealth troops landed in Boac after the war was built of the general headquarters of the Philippine Commonwealth Army and Philippine Constabulary from 1945 to 1946 station in this municipality.

The Provincial Government of Marinduque under Gov. Carmencita O. Reyes built a larger-than-life-size image of the Our Lady of Biglang Awa in cement and placed in the seashore in Balanacan Port to welcome travelers to the island.

On May 10, 2008, the Diocese of Boac celebrated the 13th anniversary and the golden anniversary of the canonical coronation of Mahal na Birhen ng Biglang-Awa (1958–2008). Cebu Archbishop-Cardinal Ricardo Vidal of Mogpog, Marinduque, officiated at the consecrated mass.

Geography
Boac is the third largest of the six municipalities of the province of Marinduque, after Santa Cruz and Torrijos. It borders all the municipalities of the province: Mogpog to the north, Santa Cruz to the Northeast, Torrijos to the East, Buenavista to the South and Gasan to the South Southwest.

The municipality is generally hilly, rugged and mountainous in the south and eastern part with thin strips of flat and farm lands and long shoreline in the west. The longest and largest river, Boac River, which gets its source in the mountainous forest in the extreme southwest and spills off to the northern shore of Boac, divides the municipality into two geographical areas: north and south.

The closest town-to-town reference to Boac is the municipality of Mogpog which is approximately 5 kilometers. Boac is connected to Mogpog and Gasan by the Marinduque Circumferential Highway or the Pan-Marinduque Highway. Two bridges connect the north and south area of the municipality: the narrow Tabi Bridge which connects Barangay Tabi and Barangay San Miguel and the said-to-be the longest bridge in the province, Biglang Awa Bridge (186m), which connects Barangay Tampus and Barangay Bantad. A narrow minor road connects Boac and Mogpog via Buliasnin-Nangka Road, and Boac and Gasan via Duyay-Tapuyan Trail. Boac has a total road network of 117.61 kilometers.

Geopolitically, Boac is divided into six zones: Poblacion, Riverside, Ilaya I, Ilaya II, Seaside A and Seaside B. Boac's geographical center is roughly located between the border of Barangay Binunga and Barangay Can-at.

Boac is home to most of the province's commercial businesses. Barangays San Miguel, Murallon, and Mercado are the town's business district where the public market, medium-rise buildings, sports arena and Boac Town Arena, now Moriones Arena are. Meanwhile, Barangay Isok is home to the town's education district. Marinduque National High School, St. Mary's College of Marinduque, Don Luis Hidalgo Memorial School, Barangay Day Care Centers, Boac North District Office and the Division of Marinduque DepED Office is in Barangay Isok. The Municipal Building Hall is at Barangay Tampus, adjacent is the Marinduque Museum at Barangay Malusak.

The Marinduque Provincial Capitol is in Barangay Santol near the Dr. Damian Reyes Memorial Hospital (formerly Marinduque Provincial Hospital) and Camp Maximo Abad.

Barangays
Boac is politically divided into 61 barangays (administrative divisions) namely:

Climate

Demographics

The most densely populated areas are in the Poblacion, northwest, and southwest barangays. Barangays in the eastern portions of the municipality are generally sparsely populated. Approximately 70% of the population lives along the national highways or within  from the national road. Furthermore, approximately 5% of the total population lives in the town proper and 10% lives in the sub-urban barangays.

Religious Institutions

 The Roman Catholic Diocese of Boac
 Assemblies of God
 Boac UNIDA Church
 Boac Gospel Church
 IRM Evangelical Church
 Jesus the Lord of Lords Church
 Potter's House Christian Fellowship
 Iglesia ni Cristo
 Jehovah's Witnesses

Economy

In the centre of town, the Boac Public Market is one of the town's landmarks. Vendors sell dry and wet products in four air-conditioned buildings. Transport terminals near the market carry goods to other barangays. It is considered to be the mini-supermarket of the province.

The poblacion area is called as Boac Central Business District (BCBD). The newly constructed two-floor Town Market with about 100 stores is in the heart of the poblacion.

Local fast food chains and restaurants include GoodChow Food Express, La Concha Restaurant, Kusina sa Plaza and many more.

Several convenience and grocery stores includes CASHypermart, New Era, Jinang-Tan, Centro Market. Puregold Boac (Marinduque) Branch was scheduled to open in November 2015.

Transportation
 Bus - linking Kamias in Quezon City and Makati to Boac via RO-RO ferry.
 Jeepneys - connecting to different municipalities of the province.
 Tricycle - serving commuters to and from interior barangays.

Biglang-Awa Bridge is the longest bridge in the province, connecting Barangay Tampus to Barangay Bantad. Many people stand on the bridge to watch the sun set and to get a good view of the Boac Cathedral.

Healthcare
Dr. Damian Reyes Memorial Hospital (formerly Marinduque Provincial Hospital) located at Brgy. Santol.
Pablo N. Marquez Memorial Health & Diagnostic Center / Boac Rural Health Unit I located at Brgy. Isok I.
Boac Rural Health Unit II located at Brgy. Bantay and serves areas in the Ilaya District.

Education

Tertiary
Marinduque State University Main Campus - a public state college located in Brgy. Tanza; formerly known as Marinduque Institute of Science and Technology and Marinduque School of Arts and Trades.
St. Mary's College of Marinduque (formerly Immaculate Conception College of Marinduque) - a private, Catholic school under the Religious of the Virgin Mary (RVM) located in Brgy. Isok I offering vocational and non-vocational courses including Teacher Education, Business Administration, and Hotel Management.
Educational Systems Technological Institute (ESTI) - a private school located in Brgy. Murallon offering vocational and non-vocational courses including Criminology, Computer Science, Tourism Management, and Marine Transportation.

Secondary
 MSC Laboratory High School - a laboratory school located in Brgy. Tanza administered by the Marinduque State University.
Marinduque National High School - the main public high school in the province. This institution was used as a camp for Japanese, American, and Filipino soldiers during World War II.
Ilaya National High School - a public high school located in Brgy. Balimbing.
Cawit National Comprehensive High School - a public high school located in Brgy Cawit.
Saint Mary's College High School Department - a private high school located in Brgy. Isok I administered by the St. Mary's College of Marinduque.
 ESTI High School Department - a private high school located in Brgy. Murallon administered by the Educational Systems Technological Institute.

Elementary

Tourism

 Kabugsakan Falls in Barangay Tugos
 Tahanan sa Isok in Barangay Isok
 Villa Aplaya Beach Resort in Barangay Ihatub
 Long beach shores from Maligaya to Cawit, mostly free
 Boac Town Plaza, located in Barangay San Miguel, is where most major gatherings and festivals are held.
 The Boac Museum, beside the Boac Town Plaza and Rizal Park, is home to a collection of facts and information about the Island.
 The Boac Cathedral is Marinduque's central cathedral. In Barangay Mataas na Bayan, it is a historical church where the Katipunan Flag is said to have been baptized. Our Lady of Immaculate Conception is the patron saint of Boac, while Birhen ng Biglang-Awa is the patroness of the province.
 In Barangay San Miguel, the Boac Town Arena is where the famous senakulo (a part of the celebration of Moriones Festival) is held.
 Casa Real is a small museum, in the former site of Rizal Park in Barangay San Miguel.
 Freedom Park in Bunganay, Boac is the main eco-tourism theme park in the municipality with team building activities, zipline, etc.
 Laylay Port is a historical landmark in the municipality where the Japanese and American troops landed. It was once a commercial port where goods and products from other places embarked.

Local heritage markers
Simbahan ng Boac - Installed at the Boac Cathedral, 1982.
Padre Diego de Saura Marker - Installed at the Saura Shrine.
Liwasan ng kalayaan - Installed at the park of the same name, December 6, 1975.
Museo at Aklatan ng Boac - Installed at the Old Spanish Building, November 30, 1987/July 30, 2002.
Maharlikang Tahanan ni Kapitan Piroko - Installed at the Lardizabal Ancestral home, February 23, 1973.
Labanan sa Paye - Installed at the battle site, barangay Balimbing, July 31, 1986.
Salvador del Mundo - Installed at the Pilar H. Lim Park, 1982.
Pilar Hidalgo Lim - Installed at the Pilar H. Lim park, 1982.
Boac Municipal Building - Installed at the municipal building, 1982.
Boac Waterworks System - Installed at the Daig Chlorination tank, 1954.
Marinduque National High School Centennial Marker, 2014

Historical markers
Site of Labanan sa Paye in Barangay Balimbing, Boac, Marinduque, the site of encounter between Filipino Revolutionary Forces and American soldiers during the Filipino-American War.
Liwasang Kalayaan at Barangay Malusak, where Revolutionary heroes led by Hermenegildo Flores and Remigio Medina were massacred by Spanish soldiers on October 10, 1897, and November 1, 1897.
Old Catholic Cemetery in Barangay Tampus, where in a common grave, remains of the victims of the October 10 and November 1, 1897, massacres were buried.
Liwasan ng mga Nagtanggol sa Inang Bayan, the lower park in front of the municipal building which is hereby dedicated to perpetuate the heroism and patriotism of all heroes, heroines and veterans of World War II.
Liwasang Pilar Hidalgo Lim, the upper park in front of the municipal building dedicated in memory and honor of Dr. Pilar Hidalgo Lim through Sangguniang Bayan Resolution No. 53-74 dated August 2, 1974.

Culture

Native Cuisine
Panganan rice cookies
Bibingkang lalaki
Marinaya pasta noodles made from squash
Sinulbot caramelized banana slices
panganan type of product make in galapong and in arrowroot who build by diego family

Events
 The Annual Moriones Festival is held in Boac and surrounding areas of Marinduque Island during the Lenten season. This holy celebration is famed as one of the most colorful festivities in Marinduque and the Philippines.
 The Feast of the Immaculate Conception is celebrated every December 8.
 The Annual Bila-Bila (Butterfly) Festival is held on the Fest of the Immaculate Concepcion. It is composed of a festive competition between zones (purok) which includes the Poblacion, Riverside, Ilaya I, Ilaya II, and Seaside Zones. The municipal government of the capital town of Boac enshrined the butterfly in a municipal ordinance entitled "Tree Farming and Butterfly Propagation Ordinance of 2002."
 Bulating Rites in Barangay Malbog, a similar practice to Quezon's Boling-boling Festival is said to have been started by one family in earlier years. It revived in 2001, as part of the municipality's tourism program. Called "Bulating" the practice is said to be an act of humility before God and/or another form of thanksgiving.

Notable personalities

Law and Academe
Ricardo Paras (February 17, 1891 - October 10, 1984) - Chief Justice of the Supreme Court of the Philippines from April 2, 1951, until February 17, 1961.
Paz Latorena (January 17, 1908 – October 19, 1953) - one of the foremost writers of the first generation of Filipino English writers, in both literary writing and education was a poet, editor, author, and teacher.
Pilar Hidalgo-Lim (May 24, 1893 - December 8, 1973) - Filipino educator and civic leader. She was married to Brig. General Vicente Lim, a World War II hero.

Sports and Entertainment
Hayden Kho - Filipino celebrity and doctor with roots from Brgy. San Miguel, Boac.
Gretchen Malalad - Filipina 2005 Southeast Asian Games karate gold medalist and a former beauty pageant contestant in Binibining Pilipinas 2002 with roots from Brgy. Tugos, Boac.
Zaijian Jaranilla - Filipino actor best known for his role as the orphan Santino in the 2009–2010 ABS-CBN religious-themed teleserye, May Bukas Pa.

Sister cities
  Tayabas City, Quezon, Philippines

References

External links

 
 [ Philippine Standard Geographic Code]
2000 Philippine Census Information
Total Population by Province, City, Municipality and Barangay as of August 1, 2007
Local Governance Performance Management System

Municipalities of Marinduque
Provincial capitals of the Philippines